Hornnes is a former municipality in the old Aust-Agder county in Norway. Hornnes was located in what is now the present-day municipality of Evje og Hornnes in the traditional district of Setesdal in Agder county. The  municipality of Hornnes existed from 1886 until 1960. The administrative centre was the village of Hornnes where the Hornnes Church is located.

History

The municipality of Hornnes was created on 1 January 1886 when the old municipality of Hornnes og Iveland was divided into two separate municipalities: Hornnes (population: 1,113) and Iveland (population: 1,103). During the 1960s, there were many municipal mergers across Norway due to the work of the Schei Committee. On 1 January 1960, Hornnes was merged with the neighboring municipality of Evje to form a new municipality called Evje og Hornnes (literally "Evje and Hornnes"). Prior to the merger Hornnes had a population of 1,280.

Name
The municipality (originally the parish) of Hornnes is named after an old Hornnes farm, since the first Hornnes Church was built there. The first element is horn which means "horn" and the last element is nes which means "headland".  So the meaning of Hornnes is "the headland shaped like a horn", probably referring to the small peninsulas on either side of the river Otra as it enters the lake Breidflå. Historically, the name was spelled Hordnæs.

Government
All municipalities in Norway, including Hornnes, are responsible for primary education (through 10th grade), outpatient health services, senior citizen services, unemployment and other social services, zoning, economic development, and municipal roads. The municipality was governed by a municipal council of elected representatives, which in turn elected a mayor.

Municipal council
The municipal council  of Hornnes was made up of 21 representatives that were elected to four year terms.  The party breakdown of the final municipal council was as follows:

Attractions

Hornnes Church
Hornnes Church is an octagonal building that was constructed in 1828. Historical records show that there was a church in Hornnes as far back as 1327.  There are also records in Rome referring to "Ornes i Odralen" (Hornnes Church is part of the Otredal prosti).

Mining
Mining is prevalent throughout the region, and Hornnes is home to the Hornnes Mineralparken.  Visitors can tour a mine and learn about the minerals such as quartz and feldspar that are mined there.

Notable residents
Hartvig Caspar Christie (1893-1959), Norwegian politician
Torleiv Hannaas (1874-1929), Norwegian philologist, chairman of Noregs Mållag
Geir Kjetsaa (1937-2008), professor

See also
List of former municipalities of Norway

References

External links

Setesdal
Former municipalities of Norway
Evje og Hornnes
1886 establishments in Norway
1960 disestablishments in Norway